Alfred Sidney Deyes (born 17 September 1993) is an English YouTuber, vlogger and businessman. On 4 September 2014, he released his first book, The Pointless Book. Since 2014, he has released three books in the Pointless Book series and one autobiography.

Career

YouTube 
Deyes started his PointlessBlog YouTube channel in 2009. , the channel has over 4.6 million subscribers and over 510 million views on YouTube. His vlogging channel has 3.6 million subscribers and over 1 billion views, while his gaming channel has over 1.5 million subscribers and over 216 million views. He also has a following of 4.8 million followers on Twitter and 3.7 million followers on Instagram. He was named by Yahoo! News as one of "12 Web-savvy entrepreneurs to watch" in December 2013, and was featured on the cover of the January 2014 edition of Company magazine for the "Generation YouTube" feature.

Deyes has collaborated with a number of other YouTubers, including Tanya Burr, Louis Cole, Louise Pentland, Grace Helbig, Tyler Oakley, Troye Sivan, Miranda Sings, Joe Sugg, Zoe Sugg and Jim Chapman. He also created a couple of videos with Ariana Grande for the You Generation network on YouTube. He currently stars, along with a number of other YouTubers, in the Style Haul series The Crew, described by teen website Sugarscape.com as "the male version of Loose Women, but a bit less pervy".

In 2013, Deyes was a member of the "Guinness World Records OMG!" channel (GWRomg) and held a number of world records, including "Most bangles put on in 30 seconds by a team of two", along with YouTubers Marcus Butler and 'Laurbubble' (which they still hold); and "Most party poppers popped in 30 seconds" with a count of 29, beating the previously set record by 1 (he subsequently lost this to Ashrita Furman in October 2013), and filling the most pancakes in one minute, with chocolate sauce and bananas, which was 7.

Deyes was included in the 2015 Debrett's 500, listing the most influential people in Britain, under the New Media category.

Published works
Deyes signed a book deal with Blink Publishing in 2014, with his debut book The Pointless Book due for release in September of the same year. The book is part journal, part activity book and includes a free downloadable app and social media integration. It has been unfavourably compared to Keri Smith's 2007 book Wreck This Journal, which contained some similar ideas. Rhik Samadder, for The Guardian, stated "It's a bit like the activity sheets given to children in museums and on planes to keep them quiet. Most of the pages are largely blank, containing instructions to "Draw a selfie" or "Fill this page in with whatever you want!", and found that while "It may not be Moby Dick", he stated that "the Pointless Book is a canny piece of merchandising."

A sequel to The Pointless Book, The Pointless Book 2, was released on 26 March 2015 and features similar content. It became the second best selling non-fiction book in its first week of release.

Deyes released a standalone autobiography, The Scrapbook Of My Life, on 24 March 2016.

In 2017, Deyes announced a third and final book in the Pointless Book series titled The Pointless Book 3. It was released on 13 July 2017.

Music
Deyes appeared on the 2014 single "Do They Know It's Christmas?" as part of the Band Aid 30 charity supergroup, raising money for the Ebola virus epidemic in West Africa.

Deyes was part of the 'YouTube Boyband' that raised money for Comic Relief.

Business interests 
Deyes is director of PointlessBlog Ltd and Pointless Holdings Ltd, alongside Dominic Smales (CEO of Gleam Futures, a digital talent management company). In October 2020, Deyes and Sugg were announced as "ambassadors" promoting A Good Company, a maker of sustainable products.

Controversies 
In 2018, Deyes uploaded a video to his YouTube channel called "Living on £1 for 24 hours" in which his aim was to spend only £1 for a full day. He received criticism from viewers and the media who claimed that Deyes was making a mockery of poverty, both in his language used and the fact he did things such as going shopping for clothes during the video, continuing to use luxury items such as his car, and was given free food after being recognised. On 18 June 2018, Deyes uploaded a video to his vlogging channel titled "Lets talk about the £1 video" in which he apologised for his actions in the video and claimed he didn't mean to mock poverty. He subsequently removed the "Living on £1 for 24 hours" video from YouTube and donated all revenue from that video to charity.

Personal life
Deyes was born in the London Borough of Enfield. His family relocated to Brighton, East Sussex when he was four years old. Deyes was educated at Varndean School in Brighton and then attended Varndean College, achieving the grades he needed to go to university. Despite being offered a place, Deyes chose to defer university and take a gap year in order to spend time travelling. Subsequently, at the end of his gap year, he chose not to attend university and continue pursuing his successful YouTube career. From age 11 to 14, Deyes participated in competitive gymnastics.

He has been in a relationship with fellow YouTube star Zoe Sugg, known publicly as Zoella, since October 2012. In early 2013, Deyes moved into a flat in London, with YouTuber Caspar Lee. Deyes moved back to Brighton in autumn 2013, eventually moving into a house with Sugg in October 2014. Shortly after moving in together, Deyes and Sugg bought a black pug named Nala. In June 2017, the couple upgraded to a larger five-bedroom house, which had been purchased in July 2015 and renovated over several months. Sugg and Deyes have one child, born in August 2021.

Awards and nominations

References

External links 
 

1993 births
21st-century English businesspeople
British Internet celebrities
English video bloggers
English YouTubers
English bloggers
Gaming YouTubers
Living people
People educated at Varndean College
People from Brighton
YouTube vloggers